The 2019 W Series Assen round (also commercially referred to as #WRace5) was the fifth round of the 2019 W Series, and took place at the TT Circuit Assen in the Netherlands on 20 July 2019. The event was an undercard to the 2019 Deutsche Tourenwagen Masters round at the same circuit.

Report

Background
Heading into the event, Jamie Chadwick leads the championship on 83 points as the only driver to score a podium at all 4 events. Having beaten Chadwick to second in Nuremberg, Beitske Visser closed the gap to ten points with two races remaining. Norisring race winner Marta García sits third, a further thirteen points behind Visser but still within maximum points of the series lead. Mathematically, both Fabienne Wohlwend and Alice Powell are still in title contention – however Wohlwend sits more than an event's worth of points behind Chadwick whereas Powell needs to win both races and all four to finish outside the top ten in both races to win the championship on a countback.

On 28 June it was announced that an additional non-championship race would be held to assist the series in experimenting with new formats for future seasons. The race will be held on 21 July, with a full-field reverse grid set to the same race distance as previous events.

The day before the event begun, W Series management would confirm the prize pool for the 2019 season as well as entry details for the 2020 season.

Practice
Ahead of Practice, Megan Gilkes would be reinstated as 'main driver' having been demoted to 'reserve driver' in Nuremberg. Vivien Keszthelyi would return to the reserve driver role.

Finnish driver Emma Kimiläinen dominated the opening session of the weekend, setting the first representative time and maintaining the top spot throughout. The only driver in the field to have raced at Assen previously, having done so in 2008, would finish nearly three tenths clear of Friday gun Jessica Hawkins and Norisring retirement Sarah Moore.

Moore would finish on top of the second practice session. Despite the later than usual session time, laptimes would prove to be slower overall than in the first session. Vittoria Piria would be second fastest with a late time putting her 0.25sec adrift of Moore, with championship leader Chadwick third. Home favourite and championship contender Visser would end the session down in 12th place.

Qualifying
Qualifying would commence at 9:30am CET. Kimiläinen would start Saturday where she left off on Friday, with the first fast representative time. With the lingering threat of rain, drivers began to push early on. Esmee Hawkey would find trouble, first spinning on the exit of turn five and later in the lap launching into a wheelie off one of the sawtooth kerbs. Alice Powell would then move to the top of the times, however the Finn would soon take the position back. Drivers would start pushing track limits, with Moore bouncing across the same kerb that caught out Hawkey whilst Fabienne Wohlwend would damage her front wing on another. With five minutes remaining in the session, Shea Holbrook would spin into the gravel and bring out a red flag. A closing minutes dash for times would ensue, however before drivers could complete their laps Piria would suffer from an engine failure out on the circuit and bring a premature end to the session. Kimiläinen would maintain pole ahead of Powell and Chadwick, with Caitlin Wood having her best result of the season with sixth.

Championship race
Kimiläinen would make an average start from pole position, with Powell moving ahead and Chadwick attempting to drive between the two however would be unable to make the move work. Further back, a bottleneck at the first corner would see Tasmin Pepper lose the rear end on the wet kerb from earlier rain and spin, with an unsighted Miki Koyama crashing into her. Koyama would retire on the spot, whilst Pepper would make it back to the pits but the damage would be deemed terminal. Koyama's stranded car would bring out the safety car.

Having passed Visser at the start, Wood started to form a train from fourth place back. Wohlwend would attempt a move on Gosia Rdest for sixth, but broke her wing on a kerb and was forced into the pits to replace it. Holbrook would take a trip through the gravel at the final chicane at the back of the field, whilst Sabré Cook would receive a drive-though penalty for starting out of position. Visser managed to get past Wood not long after.

With ten minutes remaining, Kimiläinen would force Powell into an error at the first corner – the Briton running wide and ceding the lead to the Finn. Championship contenders Chadwick and Visser would start to battle over the final place on the podium, however with two laps remaining Visser would lock a front brake at turn five and would lose time on Chadwick.

Upon taking the lead, Kimiläinen would sprint away at nearly a second a lap and would take a comfortable win over Alice Powell, Jamie Chadwick and Beitske Visser. Caitlin Wood and Gosia Rdest would achieve season-best results behind with fifth and sixth, while Jessica Hawkins would score her first points of the season in seventh. The top ten would be rounded out by Vittoria Piria, Marta García and Sarah Moore. Poor results for García and Wohlwend would see the championship fight narrowed down to just Chadwick and Visser, with thirteen points separating the pair. Kimiläinen's dominant performance would also see her claim the first 'Grand Slam' (pole position, fastest lap of the race and race win) in W Series history.

Non-championship race
The following day, a non-championship race was held in order to test a reverse-grid format. All 20 drivers would line up for a W Series race for the first time, with the grid set in reverse championship order. Megan Gilkes would therefore start the race from pole position, ahead of reserve driver Sarah Bovy and Shea Holbrook.

Classification

Practice

Qualifying

 Moore would receive a five-place grid penalty for causing a collision in the previous race.

Championship race

Non-championship race

Championship standings

See also
 2019 DTM Assen round

References

External links
Official website

|- style="text-align:center"
|width="35%"|Previous race:
|width="30%"|W Series2019 season
|width="40%"|Next race:

Assen W Series
W Series Assen
Assen
W Series Assen